Avery B. Dille was an American football and basketball player and coach.

Playing history
Dille played halfback for the Mississippi A&M (now Mississippi State University) football team and was awarded a letter for the 1910 season.

Coaching career

Football
Dillie was the coach head football at Mississippi Normal College—now known as the University of Southern Mississippi.  He held the position from 1914 until conclusion of the 1916 season and was the third person to hold the position at the school.  His overall record at Mississippi Normal was 6–10–1.

A unique positive turning point occurred in the 1916 season as the result of a loss.  In what was called the program's "Greatest pre-World War I success" the team lost to Ole Miss by a score of 13 to 7.  The school's leadership at the time took this as a sign that the program could compete nationally in the sport of football.

Due to World War I, the school ceased competing in football after completion of the 1916 season and did not restart the program until 1919, when Cephus Anderson would start the program back up.

Basketball
While at Mississippi Normal, Dillie also served as the head basketball coach from 1913 until the conclusion of the 1915–16 season, where his teams produced a record of 29–14 (.674). Dillie was the second person to hold the position at the school.

Head coaching record

References

Year of birth missing
Year of death missing
American football halfbacks
Mississippi State Bulldogs men's basketball players
Mississippi State Bulldogs football players
Southern Miss Golden Eagles football coaches
Southern Miss Golden Eagles basketball coaches
Place of birth missing
American men's basketball players